Larne Lough, historically Lough Larne, is a sea loch or inlet in County Antrim, Northern Ireland. It lies between the Islandmagee peninsula and the mainland. At its mouth is the town of Larne. It is designated as an area of special scientific interest, a special protection area, and a Ramsar site to protect the wetland environment, particularly due to the presence of certain bird species and shellfish.

Name
The lough takes its name from the small medieval territory of Latharna meaning "descendants of Lathair". The older name for the lough was Loch Ollarbha or Inbhear nOllarbha, from Ollarbha, the ancient name of the Larne Water.

Places of interest
 Chaine Memorial Tower lighthouse is on the west side of the entrance to Larne Lough.

Flora and fauna
In 1929, a "Coastal Survey" of the algae of the north-east of Ireland was begun when a few members of the Botanical Society in The Queen's University of Belfast investigated and mapped the distribution of the seaweeds. Among the algae recorded was Ascophyllum nodosum var. minor Turn. The northern end was also surveyed.

Railway line
The Belfast-Larne railway line brings the line alongside the shore line from Larne Harbour, Larne Town, Glynn, Magheramorne, and Ballycarry, over the section of land linking Islandmagee to Whitehead railway station then running alongside Belfast Lough via Carrickfergus and Belfast Central to Belfast Great Victoria Street railway station.

See also 
List of loughs in Ireland
List of Ramsar sites in Northern Ireland

References 

Ramsar sites in Northern Ireland
Areas of Special Scientific Interest in County Antrim
Special Protection Areas in Northern Ireland
Larne
Sea loughs of Northern Ireland
Landforms of County Antrim
Bodies of water of Northern Ireland
Estuaries of Europe